The Chilean Air Force is the Air force of Chile and branch of the Chilean military.

History
The first step towards the current FACh is taken by Teniente Coronel training as a pilot in France. Although a local academy was created, the first officers were sent to France for their training as well. One of them, Captain Manuel Ávalos Prado, took command over the Chilean military aviation school, which was officially established in February 1913, and remained in command until 1915. The Military Aviation School was named in honor of him in 1944, and still carries that name today.

In those early years many aviation milestones were achieved; conquering the height of the Andes was one of the main targets as well as long distance flights. Typical aircraft of that era were Avro 504, Bleriot XI, Bristol M.1C, DH.9, and SE5a. In the following decade, the Airmail Line of Chile was created on 5 March 1929 as a branch of the military aviation. This postal airline later developed into the National Airline that is still the leading airline in Chile today. Shortly afterwards, on 21 March 1930, the existing aviation elements of the army and navy were amalgamated into a dedicated department: the Department of the Air Force effectively creating the current independent Air Force. It was initially named National Air Force. The international airport of Chile carries the name of Lan's founding father and first commander of the air force, Air Commodore Arturo Merino Benítez. Its baptism of fire was in the 1931 sailors' rebellion in Coquimbo, where Air Force attack aircraft and bombers and 2 transport planes converted into bombers contributed to its failure.

The first outlines of the organization of the current air force were visible in 1945 with the inception of Transport Group 1, later renumbered Group 10, with two C-45s and a single T-6 Texan at Los Cerrillos. Two years later the first FACh flight to Antarctica was performed. The fifties meant entry into the jet age for the FACh, and Grupo 7 was the first unit to receive them in 1954. Chile got its aircraft from both the United States and Europe. The American supply consisted of Lockheed F-80, Lockheed T-33, Beech T-34 Mentor, Cessna T-37, Cessna A-37 Dragonfly and Northrop F-5E/F for example, whereas the British supplied Hawker Hunters and the French delivered various helicopters and Dassault Mirage 50 aircraft.

During the military coup d'état on September 11, 1973, the Chilean Air Force conducted Operation Silence, Hunters from the 7th Aviation Squadron destroyed several transmission antennas belonging to pro-government radio stations. After accomplishing their mission, the aircraft performed attack runs on the presidential residence at Las Condes and the presidential palace, a pilot mistakenly opened fire on the Air Force Hospital when attacking the residence, no casualties were reported.

The Chilean air force hosted the joint exercise Salitre with other friendly nations in 2014. It also participated in several United Nations peacekeeping missions overseas in 5 occasions.

The Chilean Air Force reported one of its C-130 Hercules transport aircraft carrying 38 people en route to Antarctica missing on December 9, 2019. The aircraft was on its way to Antarctica’s King George Island to provide logistic support to a military base when radio contact was lost. On 11 December 2019, aircraft debris was located 18 miles South of where the plane last made contact and no survivors were found. The cause of the crash is unknown.

Commanders-in-chief

Order of battle
Personnel = 10,600 (including 700 conscripts)

Office of the Commander in Chief

Combat Command of the Air Force

First Air Brigade with headquarters in Los Cóndores Air Base (Base Aérea Los Cóndores) in Iquique
 1st Aviation Squadron
 2nd Aviation Squadron
 3rd Aviation Squadron
 24th Air Defense Squadron
 34th Telecommunications Squadron
 44th Aviation Infantry Squadron
Second Air Brigade with headquarters in Pudahuel Air Base in Santiago
 9th Aviation Squadron
 10th Aviation Squadron
 Air Defence and Special Forces Regiment
 32nd Telecommunications Squadron
Third Air Brigade with headquarters in El Tepual Air Base in Puerto Montt
 5th Aviation Squadron
 25th Air Defense Squadron
 35th Telecommunications Squadron
Fourth Air Brigade with headquarters in Chabunco Air Base in Punta Arenas
 6th Aviation Squadron

 12th Aviation Squadron
 23rd Air Defense Squadron
 33rd Telecommunications Squadron
 19th Antarctic Exploration Squadron
Fifth Air Brigade with headquarters in Cerro Moreno Air Base in Antofagasta
 7th Aviation Squadron
 8th Aviation Squadron
 21st Air Defense Squadron
 31st Telecommunications Squadron
 41st Aviation Infantry Squadron

Personnel Command
Education Division
 Air Force School "Captain Manuel Ávalos Prado"
 Air Force NCO School "Flight Sergeant Adolfo Menadier Rojas"
 Advanced NCO School
 Air War Academy
 Air Force Polytechnical Academy
 Air Photographic Surveying Service
Health Division
General Hospital of the Air Force
Air Force High Command Prefecture

Logistics Command
Maintenance Division
Administration Division
Infrastructure Division

The Air Force also maintains the Air Force Special Forces, comparable to a United States Air Force Combat Control Team. They may be up to 350 strong, and their roles include assault, reconnaissance, Air Traffic Control, Fire Support, and Command, control, and communications.

Equipment

Industry

Chile also maintains its own aviation industry, ENAER. The design of the T-35 Pillán trainer, based on the Piper PA-28R Saratoga, is the best known example, seeing some export success as well. Furthermore, the assembly of the A-36/T-36 Halcón (CASA C-101) was achieved as well. Performing maintenance on most types in the current inventory, such as minor modifications on F-5E aircraft for example, the industry is of significant importance to the air force. ENAER is reported to be in talks with Embraer of Brazil to codesign the first indigenous South American military transport plane. Also, under the Pacer Amstel programme, with initial Dutch support, and later locally ENAER upgraded an F-16 combat jet, which for the Chilean Air Force is an advance for their maintenance of the F-16 fleet (becoming the 5th country to modify their jets under authorization).

Ranks

Officers

Enlisted

Badges

Officers

Non-commissioned officers and airmen

Officers' cap badges
Chilean Air Force officers wear the following cap badges in their peaked caps.

Notes

Bibliography

External links

 Fuerza Aérea de Chile official website
 Fuerza Aérea de Chile at Chilean Defense Ministry, official website
Fuerza Aérea de Chile website, old at Archive.org 
Ranks of Fuerza Aérea de Chile website 

 
Military units and formations established in 1930
1930 establishments in Chile
1930 in Chilean law